Spain has participated in the Eurovision Young Dancers eight times since its debut in 1985, most recently taking part in 1999. Spain is the most successful country in the contest, with a total of five wins.

Participation overview

See also
Spain in the Eurovision Song Contest
Spain in the Eurovision Young Musicians
Spain in the Junior Eurovision Song Contest

External links 
 Eurovision Young Dancers

Countries in the Eurovision Young Dancers